Trantham Hollow is a valley in Oregon County in the Ozarks of southern Missouri.

Trantham Hollow has the name of Eli Trantham, a pioneer citizen.

References

Valleys of Oregon County, Missouri
Valleys of Missouri